The Central District of Taybad County is a district (bakhsh) in Taybad County, Razavi Khorasan Province, Iran. At the 2006 census, its population was 75,893, in 16,404 families.  The District has two cities: Taybad and Kariz. The District has two rural districts (dehestan): Pain Velayat Rural District and Karat Rural District.

References 

Districts of Razavi Khorasan Province
Taybad County